Trevor Hancock was the first leader of the Green Party of Canada and a family physician. Under his leadership, the party ran 60 candidates in the 1984 federal election. He is a public health physician, and a retired professor and senior scholar at the School of Public Health and Social Policy at the University of Victoria. He obtained his degree in medicine at the University of London and his degree in health science at the University of Toronto. He also consults with the World Health Organization.  Together with Dr. Leonard Duhl, he created the Healthy Cities project that looks at environmental aspects of sustainable urban development as a determinant of health.  In 2005, Hancock was also instrumental in initiating BC Healthy Communities – a provincial initiative focused on building capacity for healthy municipal governance.

Select Bibliography
  Tesh, Sylvia Noble, Carolyn Tuohy, Tom Christoffel, Trevor Hancock, Judy Norsigian, Elena Nightingale, and Leon Robertson. "The meaning of healthy public policy." Health Promotion International 2, no. 3 (1987): 257–262. volume 2, issue 3 (1987). 1987. DOI: 10.1093/heapro/2.3.257.

See also 
 Alliance for Healthy Cities

References

External links

Green Party of Canada leaders
Canadian public health doctors
Family physicians
Living people
Year of birth missing (living people)